Anthony Joseph Shetler (born November 15, 1982) is a professional skateboarder who, as of July 2019, is pro for World Industries and is the owner of All I Need Skateboards.

Early life
Shetler was born in Brockton, Massachusetts, to Lisa Marie Oliver and Elwood Reginald Shetler. He started skateboarding in Raymond, New Hampshire with his friend Dale Raymond. He then moved back to Massachusetts, where he would develop a deep relationship with the skateshop Solstice, who helped him get his first sponsorship with 5boro Skateboards.

Coverage
Shetler has appeared in numerous skateboard magazines, including Focus, Skateboarder, Transworld Skateboarding, Thrasher, and others. He now owns a skateboard apparel company, All I Need. He partnered up with 88 Eyewear in fall of 2013 to make a limited edition line of sunglasses.

A wide variety of online magazines, stores, skateshops, and skate companies host interviews and photos of Shetler:
Alli Sports, 
Skatepark of Tampa, 
SkateboardREV, and 
True Skateboard Magazine, and 
ESPN.

An interview with Shetler aired on the action sports channel FuelTV.

Sponsors (2011)
FKD Bearings Pro Team
World Industries
Solstice Skateshop

Project Hardware
All I Need Apparel[

Video parts
EZ Pass Vacation (2002)
Surviving the Times (2008)
All I Need (2008)
State of Mind (2009)
It's Your World (2011)

Video game appearances
Shetler is an unlockable character in the Tony Hawk series of video games.

External links 
 World Industries: Pro Team
 Anthony Shetler: Facebook
All I Need: Website

References

1982 births
Living people
American skateboarders
Sportspeople from Brockton, Massachusetts